Uzi (born september 8, 1999) is a French rapper and singer from Noisiel, France. He is signed to Sportback Records and Capitol Music France. 

He started rapping in 2015–2016 and at the age of 17 had his first release "Guelar" followed by "Akrapovic" and the series Akrapo. "Drive By" attracted more attention with certain outlets refusing to play it. He adapted the slogan "rigueur, principe et boulot" and collaborated with rapper RK and Ninho. He is most famous with "À la fête" that reached #10 on SNEP, the French singles chart and was certified platinum. In February 2021, he released his first studio album Cœur abîmé that peaked at number 3 in French Albums Chart.

Discography

Albums

Singles

Featured in

Other songs

References

French rappers
1999 births
Living people
French people of Democratic Republic of the Congo descent
People from Seine-et-Marne